Mike Yakymyk (August 15, 1923 – August 31, 2016) was a Canadian football player who played for the Regina/Saskatchewan Roughriders from 1946 to 1952. He played junior football in Regina.

References

1923 births
2016 deaths
Canadian football running backs
Saskatchewan Roughriders players